Discheramocephalini is a tribe of feather-winged beetles first proposed in 2009. It contains six extant genera, and one extinct genus.

References 

Ptiliidae
Beetles described in 2009